is a former baseball player for Japan.  He initially played for the Hanshin Tigers in the Central League.

References

1975 births
Living people
Baseball people from Kanagawa Prefecture
Hosei University alumni
Japanese baseball players
Nippon Professional Baseball pitchers
Hanshin Tigers players
Nippon Ham Fighters players
Hokkaido Nippon-Ham Fighters players
Yomiuri Giants players